TU7 (ТУ7) - Soviet, later Russian diesel locomotive for gauge  – .

History
The TU7 was developed in 1971–1972 at the Kambarka Engineering Works to replace the aging locomotive classes TU4 and TU2 (ТУ2). There were 3,361 locomotives constructed, of which several hundred were exported to the countries of the socialist community and affiliated countries. In 1986 the locomotive design was updated and designated type TU7A.

D4H
The D4H  and 9 locomotives D4Hr for standard gauge , also known as the TU7 - TU7A diesel locomotive, is a series of diesel locomotives currently used on the Vietnamese railway network. With 77 locomotives D4H  in service throughout the country as of 2005, it is the most common type of locomotive in use in Vietnam. The series was originally procured from the Soviet Union after the Vietnam War.

Additional specifications 
Distance between bogies - 
Base of bogies - 
Operating speed - 500 to 1,560 r/min

See also
Narrow gauge railways
Kambarka Engineering Works

References

External links

TU7 diesel locomotive (Russian language)
TU7E in ZSSK (Slovensko) (English language)
TU7E diesel locomotives in Cuba (English language)
TU7E diesel locomotives in Vietnam (English language)

750 mm gauge locomotives
Diesel locomotives of the Soviet Union
Diesel locomotives of Russia
Diesel locomotives of Slovakia
Diesel locomotives of Estonia
Diesel locomotives of Vietnam
Diesel locomotives of Ukraine
Metre gauge diesel locomotives
Standard gauge railway locomotives